Leprieuria is a genus of fungi in the family Xylariaceae. This is a monotypic genus, containing the single species Leprieuria bacillum.

The genus name of Leprieuria is in honour of François Mathias René Leprieur (1799–1870) who was a French pharmacist and naturalist.

The genus was circumscribed by Thomas Læssøe, Jack David Rogers and Anthony James Seddon Whalley in Mycol. Res. vol.93 (Issue 2) on page 152 in 1989.

References

External links
Index Fungorum

Xylariales
Monotypic Ascomycota genera